301 Battalion was part of Sector 30 of the South West African Territorial Force.

History

61 Mech Connection
This unit was first known as the Northern Border Company and was located at Tsintsabis, close to the Alpha Cutline. It was under command of 61 Mech Battalion Group before it was placed under command of Sector 30. Sector 30 was used for Operation Yahoo, Carrot and Hokaai.

The unit consisted of Bushmen trackers and at one stage SWATF Motorised Infantry Companies.

Cutlines
The units main task was to patrol Alpha, Bravo and Charlie Cutlines as well as area between these cutlines from Oshivello to Mururani Gate in sector 20. They also patrolled the Northern Border of the Etosha Game Reserve as a final buffer against PLAN Typhoon.

The units shoulder flash was never officially recognised.

See also
 Namibian War of Independence
 South African Border War

References

Further reading
Helmoed-Romer Heitman (Author), Paul Hannon (Illustrator), Modern African Wars (3): South-West Africa (Men-At-Arms Series, 242),  Osprey Publishing (November 28, 1991) .

Military history of Namibia
Military units and formations of the Cold War
Military units and formations of South Africa
Military units and formations of South Africa in the Border War
Military units and formations established in 1984